Henry Blackstone Banning (November 10, 1836 – December 10, 1881) was a lawyer and three-term U.S. Representative from Ohio, as well as an infantry officer in the Union Army during the American Civil War.

Early life and career
Born in Bannings Mills, Ohio, Banning attended the Clinton district school, Mount Vernon Academy, and Kenyon College, Gambier, Ohio, where he stayed a short time before returning to Mount Vernon to study law in the office of Hosmer, Curtis & Devin. He was admitted to the bar in 1857 and commenced practice in Mount Vernon, Ohio.

Civil War service
With the outbreak of the Civil War, he enlisted in April 1861 in the Union Army as a private. He was commissioned as a captain in Company B of the 4th Ohio Infantry, on June 5, 1861. He served as colonel of the 87th Ohio Infantry (a three-month regiment), June 10-September 20, 1862.

Banning was honorably mustered out October 4, 1862. He reenlisted and was commissioned lieutenant colonel of the 125th Ohio Infantry on January 1, 1863. He transferred to the 121st Ohio Infantry on April 5, 1863, being promoted to colonel of that regiment on November 10, 1863.  He took part in the battles of Rich Mountain, Romney, Blue Gap, Winchester, Cross Keys, Chickamauga, Buzzard's Roost, Resaca, Rome, Kennesaw Mountain, Dallas, Peachtree Creek, Jonesboro, and Nashville.

Postbellum career
He resigned from the army on January 21, 1865, to return home to Ohio. On January 16, 1866, President Andrew Johnson nominated Banning for appointment to the grade of brevet brigadier general of volunteers, to rank from March 13, 1865, and the U.S. Senate confirmed the appointment on March 12, 1866. On February 21, 1866, President Andrew Johnson nominated Banning for appointment to the grade of brevet major general of volunteers, to rank from March 13, 1865, and the U.S. Senate confirmed the appointment on April 26, 1866.

Banning served as member of the State House of Representatives in 1866 and 1867. He moved to Cincinnati, in 1869 and resumed the practice of law. He was elected as a Liberal Republican to the Forty-third Congress and as a Democrat to the Forty-fourth Congress and Forty-fifth Congress, serving from (March 4, 1873 until March 3, 1879). He served as chairman of the Committee on Military Affairs in the Forty-fourth and Forty-fifth Congresses.

He was an unsuccessful candidate for renomination in 1878 to the Forty-sixth Congress, and for election in 1880 to the Forty-seventh Congress. He then returned to his legal practice in Cincinnati.

Henry Banning died in Cincinnati on December 10, 1881. He was interred in Spring Grove Cemetery. He is buried not far from his brother-in-law, fellow former Civil War general Byron Kirby.

Namesake
Camp 207, Ohio Sons of Union Veterans, was founded in 1903 and named in General Banning's honor and memory. It is still active in Mount Vernon, Ohio.

Banning was inducted to the Ohio Veteran's Hall of Fame in November 2004 by Ohio Governor Bob Taft. The Hall of Fame recognizes Buckeyes who continue to contribute to their community, state, and nation after their military service.

In 1868 he married Ida Kirby of Cincinnati, and had four children.

See also

List of American Civil War brevet generals (Union)
List of Ohio's American Civil War generals
Ohio in the American Civil War

Notes

References
 Retrieved on 2008-02-12
 Eicher, John H., and David J. Eicher, Civil War High Commands. Stanford: Stanford University Press, 2001. .

External links
Camp Banning SUV

1836 births
1881 deaths
People of Ohio in the American Civil War
Union Army generals
Kenyon College alumni
People from Knox County, Ohio
Burials at Spring Grove Cemetery
Members of the Ohio House of Representatives
Ohio Liberal Republicans
Democratic Party members of the United States House of Representatives from Ohio
Politicians from Cincinnati
Ohio lawyers
Liberal Republican Party members of the United States House of Representatives
19th-century American politicians
19th-century American lawyers